Subbarayalu Munuswami Sriramulu Naidu (1910-1976), also known as Sreeramulu Naidu, was an Indian businessman and movie producer from Coimbatore who founded the Pakshiraja Studios in 1945.

Life 

He was responsible for the early development of the Tamil film industry in Coimbatore and was called the "Coimbatore movie mogul". He has directed and produced films predominantly in Tamil, Telugu, Hindi and Malayalam languages, while also having made one Kannada film. In 1944, he was implicated as one of the accused in the Lakshmikanthan Murder Case and served his sentence till 1945 when he was discharged due to lack of evidence.

Selected filmography
Malaikkallan (1954)
Sabarimala Ayyappan (1961)

Awards
National Film Awards
 1954: President's Silver Medal for Best Feature Film in Tamil - Malaikkallan
 1961: Certificate of Merit for Third Best Feature Film in Malayalam - Sabarimala Ayyappan

See also
 Central Studios
 Pakshiraja Studios
 Pakshiraja Films

References
Sources
 Baker-turned filmmaker - The Hindu article
 Naidu: Hits & Misses - The Hindu (Randoor Guy)
 Reel-time nostalgia
 The Cinema Resource Centre (TCRC)

Notes

1910 births
1976 deaths
People from Coimbatore
Tamil film directors
Tamil film producers
Film producers from Tamil Nadu
Film directors from Tamil Nadu
20th-century Indian film directors